Charles Webster Bell (June 11, 1857 – April 19, 1927) was an American politician who served one term as a U.S. Representative from California from 1913 to 1915.

Biography 
Born in Albany, New York, Bell attended public schools. He moved to California in 1877 and settled in Pasadena, Los Angeles County, where he engaged in fruit growing and the real estate business. Moreover, he also served as a county clerk of Los Angeles County from 1899 to 1903. He was also a member of the state Senate from 1907 to 1913. In 1911 he was the Majority Leader in the California State Senate. Bell authored SCA 8 in 1911, which gave women the right to vote in California. Bell was elected as a Progressive Republican to the Sixty-third Congress (March 4, 1913 – March 3, 1915). However, he lost his re-election campaign to Charles Hiram Randall of the Prohibition Party. Bell was member of the Pasadena Republican Club.

After the end of his political services, Bell resumed his former business pursuits in Pasadena, California and became secretary of the Pasadena Mercantile Finance Corporation.

Personal life 
On April 19, 1927, Bell died in Pasadena, California. Bell is interred in Mountain View Cemetery.

References

External links 
 Charles W. Bell at joincalifornia.com
 

1857 births
1927 deaths
Politicians from Albany, New York
Progressive Party (1912) members of the United States House of Representatives from California
Republican Party California state senators
County clerks in California
People from Pasadena, California